Estetla Mixtec is a diverse Mixtec language of Oaxaca.

Dialects
Egland & Bartholomew found four dialects which have about 75% mutual intelligibility with each other: 

(Santa María) Peñoles
(San Antonio) Huitepec
(Santiago ) Tlazoyaltepec
(San Juan) Tamazola

References

Sources
 No author. 1977. Mixteco de Santa María Peñoles, Oaxaca. Mexico City: Centro de Investigación para la Integración Social. Series: Archivo de Lenguas Indigenas de Mexico.
 Daly, John P. 1973. A generative syntax of Peñoles Mixtec. Norman, Oklahoma: Summer Institute of Linguistics of the University of Oklahoma.

Mixtec language